Kapadvanj (Karpat – Vanjiyam or "The Land of Textile") is a town as well as one of the Taluka of the Kheda district in the Gujarat India. It is located on bank of river Mohar. It is 65 km away from Ahmedabad and 93 km away from Vadodara.

Geography

It has an average elevation of 69 metres (226 feet).

Climate
Kapadvanj usually experiences a semi-arid climate. The temperatures shoot up to 45-47 degree Celsius especially in the month of May. Hot winds blow over the region known as"Loo". Rainy season starts from July and ends in September. Rainfall is between 750-800mm. In winters temperature fall to 8-9 degree Celsius. Mild climate causes pleasant weather during the season

History, Historical Places

Jayasimha Siddharaja (1094 – 1143), chalukya king, built some of Gujarat’s finest architectural structures. He had built two exquisite Vavs (step wells) and a Torana at the centre of the old town. The main structure called kundvav is a rectangular structure, similar to plan of Modhera Sun Temple step well. However, it is smaller and simpler than Modhera’s.

Kapadvanj was a major trading centre on the route inland from the port of Cambay and trade brought it wealth and importance in the time Siddharaj Jayasinh Solanki. As it was located close to Mohar River, it was a perfect place for constructing step wells for water supply. According to local historians and elderly folks the town had five gates. The torana at Kapadvanj is one among the 13 kirtistambhas in Gujarat; however it is amongst the best preserved, only after the Vadnagar torana. It has two pillars and a transverse architrave. The entire torana is covered with elaborate sculptures.

Other historical place of Kapadvanj is Vohrawad (a Bohra neighbourhood marked by the special character of the elegantly hybrid architecture). There are few wooden havelis there. They wore even sculptures of musicians, a usual feature of pol wooden houses in Ahmedabad.

There are nine Jain Temples in Kapadvanj. Chintamani Parshwanath Temple, Astapad Temple, Glass temple of Shantinath are famous of them.

Feroze Tuglaq Mosque in Kapadvanj has a unique calligraphy originated in Gujarat called Khat-e-Bahaar which blends local elements in Arabic script.

Battles & Historical Events

Shortly after, in A.D, 1746, a battle was fought at Kapadvanj in which SherKhan was wounded. He was then forced to take shelter with Rangoji in Kapadvanj, while Fakhr-ud-daulah, Gangadhar and Krishnaji laid siege to that town. At this time Malhar Rao Holkar, on his way back from his yearly raid into Malwa, was asked by the Lunawara Chief to join him in attacking Virpur. Holkar agreed, and Virpur was plundered. Rangoji, hearing of the arrival of Holkar, begged him to come to his aid, and on the promise of receiving a sum of 20,000/ (Rs. 2,00,000) and two elephants, Holkar consented. And Fakhr-ud-daulah, hearing of the approach of Holkar,  raised the siege of Kapadvanj, and marching to Dholka.

Demographics

When Gujarat separated from Mumbai, the government created 10 dist and 40 taluka, Kapadvanj was one of them. Kapadvanj was a Lok Sabha parliamentary constituency in Gujarat. Shankarsinh Vaghela was last MP from Kapadvanj.

Education
Kapadvanj has many educational institutions like Maneklal Desai Kishor Mandir, Shree L M Sharda Mandir School, Adarsh School , M P High School, Shree Ganesh English Medium School, School for success (jeevanshilp campus)  Parekh Brothers Science College , V.M Parekh and K.S. Shah Arts and commerce college, Smt. Santaben Kanchanlal Shah (Chawada) College of Education (B. ed. college). Kapadwanj Kelavani Mandal (KKM Trust) is the oldest and pioneer non-profit entity in the town effortlessly working for providing quality education since 1940.

Politics 
Politics of kapadvanj city has always been closely contested between Indian National Congress and Bharatiya Janta Party. Other national parties with limited activities are Bahujan Samaj Party, Nationalist Congress Party. Other state parties active in kapadvanj is Mahagujarat Janta Party, Samata Party, Republic Party of India. kapadvanj has 280,899 registered voters including 143,664 Male and 137,223 Female.

kapadvanj has one state assembly constituencies. INC has always been a strong party in this arena. INC won this seat in 2017 election. Total number of voters participated were 199,642. INC got 42.67% of votes and nearest competitor was BJP with 29.04%. Election for the state assembly is held every 5 years. Current MLA of kapadvanj assembly is Dabhi Kalabhai Raijibhai.

See also
 Utkanteshwar Mahadev
 Galteshwar Temple

References

External links

 
Aapdu Kapadvanj Website

Cities and towns in Kheda district